The  Alaska Wild season was the team's fourth season as a professional indoor football franchise and second in the Indoor Football League (IFL). One of twenty-five teams competing in the IFL for the 2010 season, the Anchorage, Alaska-based Alaska Wild were members of the Pacific North Division of the Intense Conference.

Under the leadership of owner Charles Matthews and head coach Darnell Lee, the team played their home games at the Sullivan Arena in Anchorage, Alaska. Lee resigned from the Wild on May 13th, and the team forfeited its remaining home games. The IFL assumed control of the team, and made sure that the Wild played their final road game commitment at the Tri-Cities Fever.

Schedule

Regular season

Standings

Roster

References

External links
 Tri-Cities Fever official statistics

Alaska Wild
Alaska Wild
American football in Alaska
Alaska Wild